A list of books and essays about Roberto Rossellini:

Rossellini, Roberto
Bibliography